North Bergen is a hamlet in the town of Bergen in Genesee County, New York, United States.

References

Hamlets in New York (state)
Hamlets in Genesee County, New York